NK Omiš is a Croatian football club based in the town of Omiš.

References

Football clubs in Croatia
Football clubs in Split-Dalmatia County
Association football clubs established in 1919
1919 establishments in Croatia
NK Omiš